Baldwin Street, in Dunedin, New Zealand, is located in the residential suburb of North East Valley,  northeast of Dunedin's central business district. Guinness World Records calls it the steepest street in the world, meaning no street gains more altitude in 10 horizontal metres, measured along the street's centreline.

Description
The lower reaches are only moderately steep, and the surface is asphalt, but the upper reaches are steeper and surfaced in concrete ( long) for ease of maintenance (bitumen—in either chip seal or asphalt—would flow down the slope on a warm day) and for safety in Dunedin's frosty winters.

The  top section climbs  vertically, an average gradient of 1:3.41.

For cars it is a dead-end street, but Baldwin Street is linked across the top by Buchanan Street, a footpath following an otherwise unformed (i.e. unpaved) road linking it with Calder Avenue and Arnold Street, which are unformed in their upper reaches where Baldwin is steepest. The streets running parallel to Baldwin are all steep: Arnold Street (1:3.6 or 27.77 %), Dalmeny Street (1:3.7 or 27 %), and Calder Avenue (1:5.4 or 13 %).

History

The street's steepness was unintentional. As with many other parts of early Dunedin, and indeed New Zealand, streets were laid out in a grid pattern with no consideration for the terrain, usually by planners in London. In the case of Baldwin Street (and much of the Dunedin street plan), the layout was surveyed by Charles Kettle in the mid-19th century. The street is named after William Baldwin, an Otago Provincial Councillor and newspaper founder, who subdivided the area.

In 1987, Baldwin Street was recognised as the world's steepest street by the Guinness Book of Records following a two-year campaign by the broadcaster Jim Mora. At the time, Baldwin Street topped two competing streets in San Francisco, which hitherto had held the title of being the steepest streets in the world.

On 16 July 2019, Baldwin Street lost its title of World's Steepest Street to Ffordd Pen Llech, with Baldwin Street being at a gradient of 35%, and Ffordd Pen Llech being at a gradient of 37.45%. Mayor of Dunedin Dave Cull said that the Dunedin City Council could consider altering the signage wording from the world's steepest street to the southern hemisphere's steepest street. 

On 8 April 2020, after an extensive review of an appeal to return the title to Baldwin Street filed by several Dunedin residents led by surveyor Toby Stoff, it was decided that the steepness of the street must be based on the central axis, which meant that Ffordd Pen Llech had a gradient of 28.6% compared to Baldwin Street's 34.8%. This meant that the title of Steepest Street was returned to Baldwin Street.

Resident reception 
After recognition as the world's steepest street, tourism activity and events at Baldwin Street have greatly increased. The street is a popular destination on tourist buses and travel guides.

Residents have mixed reception to tourist activity on the street. Many residents reported issues with some tourists being disruptive by walking in residents' gardens, lying down on the street, and being unable to turn their vehicles. Other residents have more positive thoughts, enjoying the busy activity and excitement of living on the street.

On Ffordd Pen Llech being named the world's steepest street, and a predicted decline in tourists to Baldwin Street, Otago Chamber of Commerce chief executive Dougal McGowan remarked that "it might be a blessing in disguise for some residents fed up with crowds of visitors, trampled gardens and bad driving decisions on the street."

Associated events

The street is the venue for an annual event in Dunedin, the Baldwin Street Gutbuster. Every summer since 1988 this exercise in fitness and balance involves athletes running from the base of the street to the top and back down again. The event attracts several hundred competitors annually and the race record is 1:56.

In March 2001, a 19-year-old University of Otago student was killed when she and another student attempted to travel down the street inside a wheelie bin. The bin collided with a parked trailer, killing her instantly, and causing serious head injuries for the other student.

Since 2002, a further charity event has been held annually in July, which involves the rolling of over 30,000 Jaffas (spherical confectionery-coated chocolate confectionery). Each Jaffa is sponsored by one person, with prizes to the winner and funds raised going to charity. This event follows a tradition started in 1998, when 2,000 tennis balls were released in a sponsored event raising money for Habitat for Humanity.

On 2 January 2010, Cardrona stuntman Ian Soanes rode down Baldwin Street on a motorcycle on one wheel.

On 26 January 2018, 11-year-old Harry Willis raised over $11,000 NZD for the Ronald McDonald House in Christchurch by ascending the street on a pogo stick. The climb took around ten minutes. Willis's effort has since been commemorated with a plaque at the top of the street.

On 10 January 2019, a man rode a Lime scooter down Baldwin St, the same day that the scooters had been introduced to Dunedin and a week after Dunedin's mayor, Dave Cull, had said he was relying "on people's common sense" not to take the scooters down the world's steepest street.

See also
Other steep streets include:
A street in Stilfs in South Tyrol (Italy) has a 40% gradient as indicated by the street sign. This is a residential street and a cul-de-sac.
The Côte St-Ange in Chicoutimi, Quebec, Canada with an alleged 33% gradient (about 18°). However this again appears to be down to confusion between slope angle and percentage grade; the street is signed as having an 18% grade.
Canton Avenue, in Pittsburgh, Pennsylvania, United States; it is officially measured to be a 37% grade.
Eldred Street in Los Angeles, United States; one of three streets in Los Angeles between 32% and 33.3%.
Several short pieces of San Francisco streets are steeper, including a 9-metre section of Bradford street paved in 2010 that averages 39–40% grade.
Waipio Valley Road on the island of Hawaii. As measured by Stephen Von Worley, the road has long sections that measure 30% with peak gradients much higher; some areas up to 45%. This is a paved public road but it is not a residential street and is open only to 4 wheel drive vehicles.
 Ffordd Pen Llech in Harlech, Wales has a reported slope of 36.6% (rounded to 40% on the warning sign).
 Muro di Sormano (Wall of Sormano) is a well-known cycling stage in Northern Italy, with a maximum gradient of 27%, included in the Giro di Lombardia cycling race.
 Paso Florentino in Mexico City has a reported slope of 45%. Car accidents happen frequently on the street because of the inclination.

Many streets in the west of England and in Wales have reported slopes of 33% and higher.  Vale Street in Bristol is often also reported as the steepest street in Britain (21.81°/40.02%) and hence may have a slope even steeper than 36.6%. However, these roads are mostly shorter roads than those listed above, with far more frequent turns as opposed to the straight path of Baldwin.

Gallery

References

External links

 Map of Baldwin Street (from Wises Maps)
 Baldwin Street in Google Street View

Streets in Dunedin
World records